Spirits is an album by American jazz saxophonist Lee Konitz recorded in 1971 and released on the Milestone label.

Critical reception

Scott Yanow of Allmusic said "Altoist Lee Konitz revisits his roots in pianist Lennie Tristano's music on this enjoyable recording ...this is excellent music and finds altoist Lee Konitz in creative form".

Track listing 
All compositions by Lennie Tristano unless noted.
 "Baby" – 4:23
 "Dreams" – 5:12
 "Two Not One" – 5:35
 "Hugo's Head" (Lee Konitz) – 3:39
 "Background Music" (Warne Marsh) – 3:59
 "Lennie-Bird" – 4:37
 "Wow" – 4:26
 "Kary's Trance" (Konitz) – 6:29
 "Another 'Nother" (Konitz) – 6:07

Personnel 
Lee Konitz – alto saxophone
Sal Mosca – piano
Ron Carter – bass (tracks 3–5 & 9)
Mousey Alexander – drums (tracks 3–5 & 9)

References 

Lee Konitz albums
1971 albums
Milestone Records albums
Albums produced by Orrin Keepnews